Countess Anna Ivanovna Tolstaya, née Princess Baryatinskaya (Анна Ивановна Толстая; December 5, 1774 - April 12, 1825) was the sister of prince Ivan Baryatinsky, wife of Marshal Nikolai Alexandrovich Tolstoy (1765–1816), a close friend of the Empress Elizabeth Alexeyevna and memoirist Countess Varvara Golovina.

Biography
Daughter of Prince Ivan Baryatinsky, the Russian ambassador in Paris, and Princess Catherine Petrovna Holstein-Beck of Oldenburg, Princess Baryatinskaya held a high position in the world. To be invited to her house was considered a great honor. Wealth allowed her to live well and lush. The poet Ivan Dolgorukov was a frequent guest of Princess Baryatinskaya; he participated in performances at her home and took care of her daughter, Anna.

In 1787, Anna became the wife of Count Nikolai Alexandrovich Tolstoy. At his appointment in May 1793 as the great chamberlain of Grand Duke Alexander Pavlovich, the future Alexander I of Russia, Anna was presented to the court.

Beautiful and cute, for withdrawal of his cousin Varvara Golovina, and the shy and silent Countess Tolstoy quickly became a member of the most intimate circle at Grand Duke Alexander Pavlovich's court. From that time, she had a close friendship with the young Grand Duchess Elizabeth Alexeievna, the former Louise of Baden, who affectionately called her  la longue (long), as Anna was very tall.

Family life
The family life of Countess Anna Ivanovna was not happy. Strongly grieving the death in 1797 of her youngest daughter Eudoxia, she and her husband quarreled. Anna fell in love with the English envoy Charles Whitworth, 1st Earl Whitworth, who was quite indifferent to it, but he very often visited her house for intrigue and blind. At the same time he was in open communication with Olga Zherebtsova and led the planned conspiracy against the emperor Paul I of Russia, with Nikita Petrovich Panin and Admiral José de Ribas. Count Tolstoy, all the time to see the result of which they were constant quarrels between the couple. Soon intrigue with Whitworth was discovered, and emperor Paul I asked the British government to remove the ambassador in 1800.

Her husband's jealousy, quick temper and unbridled nature led Anna Ivanovna to decide to leave. With great difficulty, procured by his brother, under the mediation of mistress Ivan Kutaisov, actress Madame Chevalier, the consent of the emperor to depart abroad, she left in 1800 to his mother in Berlin. But soon the Countess Tolstoy was disappointed in her feelings for Whitworth, and in April 1801 in London he married the widowed Duchess of Dorset. His marriage discovered it, in her own words, eyes to the abyss into which it was ready to use.

After Paul I of Russia's death in March 1801, at the request of the Empress Elizabeth Alexeievna, Countess Tolstoy returned to her husband in Russia. She was present at the coronation of Tsar Alexander I of Russia in Moscow, but soon again went abroad with the children and traveled extensively in Europe. She remained a close friend of the Empress. Her letters to the Empress were published in 1909 by Grand Duke Nikolai Mikhailovich.

Countess Tolstoy's friendship with the French émigrée, Louise Emmanuel de Chartillon, Princess de Tarant, and communication with others in Saint Petersburg's Catholic world, had its effect on Anna Ivanovna: she converted to Catholicism from Russian Orthodoxy among many women, the highest Saint Petersburg circle. This change of religion, however, forced Countess Tolstoy to go abroad. She settled in Florence in her own villa. Count Felix Golovkin wrote in November 1816 from Italy:

"Princess Gagarin close friend of my niece Tolstoy, and they associates to Catholicism. They are led by secular women, departed from the Orthodox Church, and was the cause of careless ardor expulsion of the Jesuits from Russia. Here, where they are free to worship the God of Rome, they observe utmost restraint, and in St. Petersburg, they dreamed of martyrdom as an Italian dream of lovers."

Widowed in December 1816, Countess Tolstoy died in Paris on April 12, 1825, and was buried in the Cimetière du Mont-Valérien.

Children
She had two sons and two daughters:

Ekaterina (15 August 1789 - 11 February 1870), grew up near the Court, the use of constant attention and the location of the Empress, mingle in society Countess V. Golovin and her daughters. Her name is often found in the correspondence of the Empress Elizabeth Alekseievna and notes Golovina Countess and her daughter, the Countess of PN Fredro. She was married to Lieutenant General Prince Constantine Ksaverevichem Lubomirski (1786–1870), and had a son and six daughters.
Eudokia  (1793–1797)
Alexander Nikolayevich Tolstoy (1793–1866), was married to Princess Anna Mikhailovna Scherbatova, died in Nice.
Emmanuel  (1802–1825), is buried in the Volkov Lutheran Cemetery in Saint Petersburg.

Notes
Dolgorukov IM temples of my heart, or a dictionary of all those with which I have been in various ways in the course of my life -. M., 1997.
The life story of a noble woman. - New York: New Literary Review, 1996.-P.125.
Gr. Prince. Nikolai Mikhailovich. Elizabeth A., wife of Emperor Alexander I. V.1. - S.262-263.
Russian portraits of the 18th and 19th centuries. T.4.Vyp.1. Number 18.
F. G. Golovkin. Court and reign of Paul I. Portraits, the memories. -M, 2003, p. 289.

1774 births
1825 deaths
Converts to Roman Catholicism from Eastern Orthodoxy
Converts to Roman Catholicism
Former Russian Orthodox Christians
Russian Roman Catholics